Elachorbis diaphana is a minute sea snail, a marine gastropod mollusc in the family Tornidae. This species is only known to occur in the area of the Foveaux Strait, New Zealand.

References

 Powell A. W. B., New Zealand Mollusca, William Collins Publishers Ltd, Auckland, New Zealand 1979 

Tornidae
Gastropods of New Zealand
Gastropods described in 1924
Taxa named by Harold John Finlay